The 2019 Women's EuroHockey Championship III was the eight edition of the Women's EuroHockey Championship III, the third tier of the women's European field hockey championships organized by the European Hockey Federation. It was held from 28 July until 3 August 2019 in Lipovci, Slovenia.

The finalists were promoted to the EuroHockey Championship II

Teams
The following eight teams, shown with pre-tournament world rankings, competed in this tournament.

Gibraltar withdrew right before the competition started. This caused Hungary to be moved to pool B, replacing Gibraltar in all the games against the other teams in pool B. Pool A was left with the three remaining teams. 

 (42)
 (28)
 (–)
 (–)
 (36)
 (–)
 (49)
 (39)

Results
''All times are local, CEST (UTC+1).

Preliminary round

Pool A

Pool B

Fifth to seventh place classification

Pool C
The points obtained in the preliminary round from the two teams in pool B against each other are taken over.

First to fourth place classification

Semi-finals

Third place game

Final

Statistics

Final standings

 Promoted to the EuroHockey Championship II

Goalscorers

See also
2019 Men's EuroHockey Championship III
2019 Women's EuroHockey Championship II

References

Women's EuroHockey Championship III
International women's field hockey competitions hosted by Slovenia
Women 3
EuroHockey Championship III Women
EuroHockey Championship III Women
EuroHockey Championship III Women
EuroHockey Championship III
2019 in Slovenian women's sport